Swallowed is a 2022 American independent body horror film written and directed by Carter Smith. The film stars Cooper Koch, Jose Colon, Jena Malone, and Mark Patton. It follows two friends who, on their final night out, end up smuggling drugs via swallowing the sacs which unfortunately takes a bad turn. It received polarizing reviews from critics.

Premise

Cast
 Cooper Koch as Benjamin
 Jose Colon as Dom
 Jena Malone as Alice
 Mark Patton as Rich
 Roe Pacheco as a Border Officer
 Michael Curtis as Randy Redneck
 Jonathan Spence as Thee Suburbia (themself)
 Hannah Berry as Dee

Production

Writer/director Carter Smith had wanted to make a low-budget film akin to a directorial debut, in contrast to his own feature debut The Ruins (2008). Upon writing, Smith had written the role of Rich for Mark Patton, while The Ruins collaborator and friend Jena Malone was the first choice he had in mind for Alice. Additionally, Jose Colon was cast after previously starring in a photoshoot series for Smith's gay-centric All the Dead Boys banner, while Cooper Koch was cast by Smith immediately upon viewing his audition tape.

Filming was shot in Maine, where Carter had lived previously; the cabin used was built by his father.

Release
Swallowed premiered at the Fantasia International Film Festival in Montreal on July 15, 2022. It also screened at Fantastic Fest in Austin, Texas and FrightFest on September 23-28 and October 28 that same year, respectively. In January 2023, Momentum Pictures purchased the North American distribution rights, and released the film on video-on-demand and other digital retailers on February 14, 2023.

Critical response

References

External links
 Swallowed at All the Dead Boys
 

2022 independent films
2022 films
Body horror films
Films about drugs
Films about gay male pornography
Momentum Pictures films